Monomorium smithi is an ant of the family Formicidae, endemic to New Zealand.

References

 Antweb
 LandCare 

smithi
Ants of New Zealand
Endemic fauna of New Zealand
Insects described in 1892

Hymenoptera of New Zealand
Endemic insects of New Zealand